For people with the surname, see Brusasco (surname).

The main sights are the castle and the Palazzo Ellena, both from the 18th century.

References

Cities and towns in Piedmont